Theodore Frederick Charles Edward Shaw (11 September 1859 – 17 April 1942) was a British Liberal Party politician.

Background
Shaw was the eldest son of Edward Dethick Shaw and Millicent Augusta Gough, both of Wolverhampton. He was educated at Tettenhall College, Wolverhampton and Balliol College, Oxford.

Career
He was Managing Director and Chairman of John Shaw & Sons Ltd. of Wolverhampton. He was a Member of Wolverhampton Town Council. He was a Captain in the 3rd Volunteer Battalion of the South Staffordshire Regiment. He was Liberal MP for Stafford from 1892 to December 1910. He was created 1st Baronet in 1908.

Private life
Shaw married at St. Mark's, Piccadelly, on 17 January 1900,  Emily White Bursill, daughter of Henry Bursill, of Hampstead. The couple lived at Charters at Sunningdale in Berkshire, with their two daughters.

Sources and References
Who Was Who
Debretts House of Commons and Judicial Bench - 1901
British Parliamentary Election Results 1885 - 1918, F. W. S. Craig

External links 
 
 National Portrait Gallery; photograph of Shaw and his wife
Who's Who

1859 births
1942 deaths
Liberal Party (UK) MPs for English constituencies
UK MPs 1892–1895
UK MPs 1895–1900
UK MPs 1900–1906
UK MPs 1906–1910
UK MPs 1910
People from Wolverhampton
People from Sunningdale
Members of the Parliament of the United Kingdom for Stafford
Baronets in the Baronetage of the United Kingdom